A central part of H.L.A. Hart's theory on legal positivism, in any legal system, the rule of recognition is a master meta-rule underlying any legal system that defines the common identifying test for legal validity (or "what counts as law") within that system. According to Hart:

In Hart's view, the rule of recognition arises out of a convention among officials by which they accept the rule's criteria as standards that impose duties and confer powers on officials, and resolves doubts and disagreements within the community. The rule is cognizable from the social practices of officials acknowledging the rule as a legitimate standard of behavior, exerting social pressure on one another to conform to it, and generally satisfying the rule's requirements. To this end, as explained by Hart, the rule has three functions:
 To establish a test for valid law in the applicable legal system
 To confer validity to everything else in the applicable legal system
 To unify the laws in the applicable legal system

The validity of a legal system is independent from its efficacy. A completely ineffective rule may be a valid one - as long as it emanates from the rule of recognition. But to be a valid rule, the legal system of which the rule is a component must, as a whole, be effective. According to Hart, any rule that complies with the rule of recognition is a valid legal rule. For example, if the rule of recognition were "what Professor X says is law", then any rule that Professor X spoke would be a valid legal rule.

It follows that the rule of recognition is but a factual acknowledgement of what is indeed law; as per the classic illustration of a bill passed by the legislative authority and assented to by a head-of-state. The fact that the bill has been made law in accordance with proper parliamentary procedure shall, in accordance with the Rule of Recognition, render it valid law. Again, this is primarily based on the fact of its existence in such manner. The judgment in R (Factortame Ltd) v Secretary of State for Transport (decided March 1989 to November 2000) represents an alteration of the Rule of Recognition, by confirming the incompatibility of UK legislation (the Merchant Shipping Act) with EU law, and deciding that the provisions of such law were to be disapplied by the UK courts if they contravened EU law. Sir William Wade, a renowned authority in British constitutional law, would confirm this view. Following Brexit, however, this view would maintain significance only as part of legal history.

References

Philosophy of law